Lisa Ann Beley is a Canadian voice actress who often voices over roles which have either regal, motherly, or older sisterly love and authority within them.

Early life
Beley grew up in Edmonton, Alberta, before moving to Vancouver, where she studied in the University of British Columbia's acting program and received her BFA in 1990. In 1995 she went back to school and received her MFA and Voice Teachers diploma from York University two years later Beley now lives in Washington D.C.. Beley is married to fellow voice actor Jonathan Holmes and has one daughter.

Voice roles

Anime dubbing
 .hack//Roots - Ender, Pi
 Black Lagoon - Eda
 Brain Powered - Dr. Irene Carrier, Kanan's Mother
 The Daichis - Earth's Defense Family - Seiko Daichi
 Death Note - Halle Lidner
 Dragon Ball Z - Chi-Chi (Ocean Group dub) (Movie 1 Dead Zone and Movie 2 The World's Strongest)
 Dragon Drive - Agent L, Mukai's Mother
 Elemental Gelade - Ofrus
 Fatal Fury: The Motion Picture - Mai Shiranui
 Inuyasha - Enju, Additional Voices
Inuyasha: The Final Act - Shishinki's assistant
 Junkers Come Here - Suzuko Nozawa
 Mix Master - Jamine, Bubri
 Melty Lancer: The Animation - Melvina MACGARLEN
 Mobile Suit Gundam - Kamaria Ray
 Mobile Suit Gundam 00 - Sumeragi Lee Noriega/Leesa Kujo
 Mobile Suit Gundam SEED - Eileen Canaver, Murrue Ramius
 Mobile Suit Gundam SEED Destiny - Murrue Ramius
 Mobile Suit Gundam Wing - Relena Peacecraft/Darlian
 Powerpuff Girls Z - Joey
 Ronin Warriors - Lady Kayura
 Nurse Witch Komugi - Yui Kihara
 Shakugan no Shana - Tiamat (Season 1)
 Silent Möbius  - Kiddy Phenil, Rosa Cheyenne (Teenager), Teres Vargie
 The SoulTaker - Yui Kihara
 The Story of Saiunkoku - Shokun Hong, Young Koyu Ri, Lady of the Night 1, Seien's Mother
 Tico of the Seven Seas
 Transformers: Cybertron - Override
 The Vision of Escaflowne - Marlene Ashton
 The New Adventures of Kimba The White Lion - Riya
 Zoids Zero - Mary Champ 
 Voltron Force - Onna Cat Kendall Zelda

Non-anime
 Hot Wheels AcceleRacers - Karma Eiss
 Death Note 2: The Last Name - Kiyomi Takada (English dub)
 Eternals - Thena Elliot, Ludmilla
 Exosquad - Lt. Nara Burns
 G.I. Joe: Spy Troops - Scarlett
 G.I. Joe: Valor vs. Venom - Scarlett
 He-Man and the Masters of the Universe - Teela
 Inhumans - Medusa
 Iron Man: Armored Adventures - Iron Man Onboard Computer
 Max Steel: Countdown - Kat Ryan
 Max Steel: Dark Rival - Kat Ryan
 Planet Hulk - Caiera
 Sherlock Holmes in the 22nd Century - Additional Voices
 Slugterra - Resistance Leader, Tough Kid
 Street Fighter - Cammy
 Hero 108  - Miranda Bayer, Evan Wakowski (Kid), Amy, Agent #5, Nurse, Spider-Woman, Female Scientist, Tech
 X-Men: Evolution - Dr. Deborah Risman/Madame Hydra

Video games
 Dynasty Warriors Gundam 2 - Rezin Schnyder (English Version)
 Mobile Suit Gundam: Encounters in Space - Kycilia Zabi, Cima Garahau (English Version)
 Mark of the Ninja - Ora
 Warhammer 40,000: Dawn of War: Soulstorm - Additional Voices
 Invisible, Inc. - Nika

References

External links
 
 

Living people
Actresses from Edmonton
Actresses from Vancouver
Canadian expatriate actresses in the United States
Canadian schoolteachers
Canadian video game actresses
Canadian voice actresses
Year of birth missing (living people)
20th-century Canadian actresses
21st-century Canadian actresses